Mbulelo Botile (born 23 July 1972) is a South African former professional boxer who competed between 1989 and 2005. He is a world champion in two weight classes, having held the IBF bantamweight title from 1995 to 1997 and the IBF featherweight title from 2000 to 2001.

Professional career

Botile turned pro in 1989 and won his first twenty-one bouts, including fifteen straight to set up a shot at the IBF Bantamweight title against Harold Mestre in 1995.  Botile won with a second-round KO.  He successfully defended the title five times before losing the belt to Tim Austin in 1997, by a seventh-round TKO.

Botile moved up in weight and in 2000 took on IBF Featherweight title-holder Paul Ingle, winning the belt with a twelfth-round TKO. He lost a decision in his first defence against Frank Toledo in 2001 and then moved up to Super featherweight. He took on former champion Cassius Baloyi in 2002, losing by an eleventh-round TKO. Botile retired after the loss, but came back in 2005, only to be knocked out by Anthony Tshehla.

Botile later stated that the injuries caused to Paul Ingle, during the bout in 2000, had caused him such distress, that he had never felt focused on boxing again.

Professional boxing record

See also
List of bantamweight boxing champions
List of featherweight boxing champions

References

External links

1972 births
Living people
Bantamweight boxers
Featherweight boxers
Super-featherweight boxers
World bantamweight boxing champions
World featherweight boxing champions
International Boxing Federation champions
International Boxing Organization champions
South African male boxers
People from Buffalo City Metropolitan Municipality